Acacia splendens is a tree or shrub of the genus Acacia and the subgenus Phyllodineae that is endemic to a small area of western Australia.

Description
It has thick, glabrous branchlets that are angled at the extremities and covered in a fine white powdery coating. Like most species of Acacia it has phyllodes rather than true leaves. It blooms in May and produces yellow flowers. The spherical to obloid shaped flower-heads contain 33 to 75 golden coloured flowers.

Taxonomy
The species was first formally described by the botanists Bruce Maslin and Carole Elliott in 2006 as a part of the work Acacia splendens (Leguminosae : Mimosoideae), a new rare species from near Dandaragan, Western Australia as published in the journal Nuytsia.

Distribution
It is native to a small area in the Wheatbelt region of Western Australia all found in a single population to the north west of Dandaragan growing gravelly loam soils among laterite breakaways as a part of low Eucalyptus woodland communities.

See also
List of Acacia species

References

splendens
Acacias of Western Australia
Taxa named by Bruce Maslin
Plants described in 2006